WEL or Wel or variation, may refer to:

Places
 Wel, a river in Poland 
 Wel, a tributary of the Bhima River in India
 Wel Landscape Park, Działdowo County, Warmian-Masurian Voivodeship, Poland
 West End, London (WEL), England, UK

Facilities and structures
 Welch Hall (University of Texas at Austin), abbreviated as "WEL"
 Tokyo Kōsei Nenkin Kaikan (also called Wel City), a concert hall in Tokyo, Japan
 Wellingborough railway station (station code WEL), Wellingborough, Northamptonshire, England, UK

People
 Master Wel (1943–2002), U.S. composer and playwright
 Arend van der Wel (1933–2013), Dutch soccer player
 Clara van Wel (born 1997), New Zealand singer-songwriter
 Dominique Wel (born 1997), New Caledonian soccer player
 Gerardus van der Wel (1895–1945), Dutch long distance runner
 Isis van der Wel (born 1975, stagename DJ Isis), Dutch DJ

Groups, organizations, companies
Women's Electoral Lobby (disambiguation), several feminist lobby groups
 WEL Networks, (formerly "Waikato Electricity Limited"), an electric distribution company in Waikato, New Zealand
 Welspun Energy Limited (WEL), an Indian power company
 Weybridge Ladies Amateur Rowing Club (British Rowing code WEL)
 Weymann-Lepère (abbreviated "WEL"), a French aircraft company; see List of aircraft manufacturers (T–Z)
 Veles: Ukrainian Aviation Company (ICAO airline code WEL); see List of airline codes (V)

Other uses
 Welsh language (ISO 639 language code: wel)
 Welteislehre (abbreviated as "WEL"), aa cosmological theory proposed by Austrian Hans Hörbige

See also

 
 
 
 WELE
 Weles
 Well (disambiguation)
 Welle (disambiguation)
 Wels (disambiguation)
 Wells (disambiguation)
 Welles (disambiguation)